Isac Doru (born 14 July 1962 in Craiova) is a Romanian football manager.

Managerial career 
Isac Doru, a FIFA Diploma degree holder has gained experience from heavy names in international football. During the period spent at Nagoya Grampus Eight, he was the assistant of Arsène Wenger. Before he left Japan, Doru worked with Carlos Queiros, former Real Madrid, and Manchester United and Bora Milutinović.

References

External links
Doru Isac Asian Games website
Doru Isac campion cu Al-Sadd 

1962 births
Living people
Romanian football managers
Romanian expatriate football managers
Sportspeople from Craiova
Al Sadd SC managers
Umm Salal SC managers
Al-Ta'ee managers
Saudi First Division League managers
Romanian expatriate sportspeople in India
Romanian expatriate sportspeople in Japan
Romanian expatriate sportspeople in Qatar
Romanian expatriate sportspeople in Saudi Arabia
Romanian expatriate sportspeople in Singapore
Expatriate football managers in Japan
Expatriate football managers in Qatar
Expatriate football managers in Saudi Arabia